Brahmastram is a 1986 Indian Telugu-language action film, produced by D. Kaasi Viswanatha Rao under the Sri Dhairya Lakshmi Pictures banner and directed by G. Ram Mohana Rao. It stars Krishna and Vijayashanti with music composed by Chakravarthy. It is a remake of a 1984 Kannada language film "Chanakya" starring Dr. Vishnuvardhan and Madhavi in the lead roles.

Cast

Krishna as Barrister Vidya Sagar
Vijayashanti as Jaya
Rajendra Prasad as Satish
Rao Gopala Rao as Gopanna
Kannada Prabhakar as Nagaraju 
Jaggayya 
Nutan Prasad as Prasad
Rama Krishna as Inspector Jaganath
Kanta Rao
Padmanabham
C. S. Rao as Judge
Suthi Velu
Sakshi Ranga Rao 
Saikumar as Govind
Srilakshmi
Varalakshmi as Jyothi
Shubha 
Anitha

Crew
Art: Thota Hemasundar
Choreography: Saleem
Fights: Judo Ratnam
Dialogues: Satyanand
Lyrics: Veturi
Playback: Raj Seetharam, P. Susheela
Story: Viatnam Veedu Sundaram
Music: Chakravarthy
Editing: Kotagiri Gopala Rao
Cinematography: V. S. R. Swamy
Producer: D. Kasi Viswanatha Rao
Director: G. Rama Mohana Rao
Banner: Sri Dhairya Lakshmi Pictures
Release Date: 14 February 1986

Soundtrack

Music composed by Chakravarthy. Lyrics were written by Veturi. Music released on LEO Audio Company.

References

Indian action films
Films scored by K. Chakravarthy
1980s Telugu-language films
1986 action films
1986 films